Rutherford County Courthouse may refer to:

 Rutherford County Courthouse (North Carolina), listed on the National Register of Historic Places (NRHP) in North Carolina
 Rutherford County Courthouse (Tennessee), listed on the NRHP in Tennessee